Aistopetalum is a genus of trees in the family Cunoniaceae. It is endemic to New Guinea and includes two species: Aistopetalum multiflorum  and Aistopetalum viticoides .

References

Cunoniaceae
Oxalidales genera
Endemic fauna of New Guinea